Simon James King (born 4 September 1987) is an English cricketer who played for Surrey from 2009 to 2011. He was educated at Warlingham School, and The John Fisher School in Purley, Croydon, Surrey.

Born in Camberwell, grew up in Warlingham, King is predominantly a right arm off break bowler who bats right-handed. He made his debut for Surrey's second XI in 2005, taking 17 wickets in his first season, and took a further 30 the following year. May 2006 saw King invited to a trial for the England under-19 side, but he did not make an official appearance for the side.

King made his first-team debuts in Twenty20 and first-class cricket in 2009, appearing in matches against Kent, Middlesex and Derbyshire. His first wicket was that of Middlesex's David Nash.

He was released by Surrey at the end of the 2011 season.

His younger brother, Daryl, came through the age groups from the age of 8 through to academy, he also made appearances for Surrey's second XI in 2009.

References

1987 births
Living people
English cricketers
Surrey cricketers
People from Camberwell
English cricketers of the 21st century

ta:சைமன் கிங்